Blepharocerus rosellus is a species of snout moth in the genus Blepharocerus. It was described by Charles Émile Blanchard in 1852. It is found in Chile.

References

Chrysauginae
Moths described in 1852
Endemic fauna of Chile